Dictionary of the Irish Language: Based Mainly on Old and Middle Irish Materials (also called "the DIL"), published by the Royal Irish Academy, is the definitive dictionary of the origins of the Irish language, specifically the Old Irish, Middle Irish, and Early Modern Irish stages up to c. 1700; the modern language is not included. The original idea for a comprehensive dictionary of early Irish was conceived in 1852 by the two preeminent Irish linguists of the time, John O'Donovan and Eugene O'Curry; however, it was more than sixty years until the first fascicle (the letter D as far as the word , compiled by Carl J. S. Marstrander) was published in 1913. It was more than sixty years again until the final fascicle (only one page long and consisting of words beginning with H) was published in 1976 under the editorship of E. G. Quin.

The full dictionary comprises about 2500 pages, but a compact edition (four original pages photoreduced onto one page) was published in 1983, and the decision was made to discontinue printing the full-size edition.

eDIL

A web site has been established to permit scholars to submit annotations for the DIL.

As a result of a project started in 2003, the online edition, known as the electronic Dictionary of the Irish Language (or eDIL), was launched in the Royal Irish Academy on the 27 June 2007. The launch was organised by the Foclóir na Nua-Ghaeilge team in the Academy.

References

External links
DIL, the Dictionary of the Irish Language
eDIL, the electronic Dictionary of the Irish Language

Irish dictionaries
1976 non-fiction books
Online dictionaries